The Necessidades Palace is a historic building in the Largo do Rilvas, a public square in Lisbon, Portugal. It serves as headquarters of the Portuguese Foreign Ministry. The Palace has been classified as a Property of Public Interest since 1983.

History

Formerly a convent belonging to the Congregation of the Oratory of Saint Philip Neri, it was built in the 18th century, by order of King John V, in gratitude for prayers answered by Our Lady of Needs, whose first devotional chapel stood on this site.

The palace became the residence of the kings of the Braganza dynasty, beginning in the reign of Maria II, and all subsequent monarchs lived there, except for her son, Luís I, who preferred to use the Palace of Ajuda. Ferdinand of Saxe-Coburg and Gotha, husband of Maria II, lived in this palace until his death, amassing a large collection of art, which would be dispersed after his death. The palace then underwent several renovations to accommodate the taste of the various monarchs who lived there, the most recent of which was carried out at the beginning of the twentieth century by Carlos I. He enlarged the state dining room because of the frequency of diplomatic activity undertaken there.

The palace was the scene of memorable events in Portuguese history, some momentous, some tragic, some slightly ridiculous. One famous example: the king Peter V had installed in the front door of the palace a slot through which his subjects could, if they wished to, leave messages and complaints for the attention of the sovereign. The last significant event at the palace, which would also be the epilogue of the monarchy, was the joint funeral of King Carlos and his son, Prince Luís Filipe, on 8 February 1908, after their assassination by radical republicans.

On 5 October 1910, during the Republican Revolution, the palace, because it was the official residence of the king, Manuel II, was shelled by the cruiser Adamastor, one of the ships stationed in the Tagus River. The salvoes caused some damage to the Palace, and one of the bomblets even reached the king's private quarters on the first floor, but he had taken refuge elsewhere on the palace grounds. Thanks to the quick thinking of an employee of the building, who cut down the flagpole that customarily displayed the royal banner whenever the monarch was in residence, the Republicans were led to believe that Manuel II had abandoned his home. The king did indeed leave Lisbon a few hours later, and he took refuge in the royal palace at Mafra, 28 kilometres northwest of the capital.

Many works of art housed in the palace were the private property of Manuel II and followed him to his residence in exile in London.

Ministry of Foreign Affairs 
After the proclamation of the republic on 5 October 1910, the palace remained unoccupied for almost 40 years. In around 1950 it became the headquarters of the Portuguese Ministry of Foreign Affairs, a function that continues until the present day. Most of the royal collections, of art, furnishings and other bric-a-bracs were transferred to the museum of the Palace of Ajuda.

Just as the word Whitehall is a convenient way of referring to the British government, today, any use of the word Necessidades is a shorthand way of speaking of the Portuguese foreign ministry or the foreign policy of Portugal, in general.

See also
 List of Baroque residences
 Lisbon regicide

References

External links 

Palaces in Lisbon
Official residences in Portugal
Royal residences in Portugal
Houses completed in 1750
Necessidades
Baroque architecture in Portugal